Sissel Lie (born 12 November 1942) is a Norwegian novelist, translator, playwright and professor in Romance languages and literature at the University of Trondheim since 1992.

Biography
Sissel Lie was born in Kristiansand, in Vest-Agder county, Norway. Her literary début, the short story collection Tigersmil, won Tarjei Vesaas' debutantpris for 1986. Her works have been translated into eight languages as of 2004. She has edited anthologies of French poets and translated poetry, short stories and novels from the French language. She has also been co-editor of Kvinnenes kulturhistorie (1985–1988).

Drama 
Dansen, Trondheim Kunstmuseum
Svømmersken, performed at the National Theatre (1998)

Bibliography 
Tigersmil – short story anthology (1986)
Løvens hjerte – novel (1988)
Sjelen har intet kjønn : kvinner og kjærligheten i franske romaner på 1600-tallet og 1700-tallet – non-fiction, (1988)
Granateple – novel, (1990)
Reise gjennom brent sukker – novel (1992)
Rød svane – novel, (1994)
Pusegutten er en drittsekk – children's book, (1995) (illustrated by Kim Hiorthøy)
Fri som foten : om å skrive fagtekster – textbook (1995)
Pusegutten og den lille gule – children's book, (1996) (illustrated by Kim Hiorthøy)
Pusegutten er eldst og tykkest og det har han tenkt å fortsette med! – children's book, (1997) (illustrated by Kim Hiorthøy)
Svart due – novel, (1997)
Bustehøner på busstur – children's book, (1998) (with Kjersti Lie, illustrated by Finn Graff)
Pusegutter tåler nesten alt – children's book, (1999)
Mor og Medusa : portrett av den moderne kunstneren – non-fiction, (1999)
Jakten på jeget : blant amasoner og franske forførere – non-fiction, (2003)

Prizes 
Tarjei Vesaas' debutantpris (1986) for Tigersmil
Gyldendal's Endowment (1992)

References

External links
Nordic Womenwriters profile
Gyldendal profile
Aftenposten profile
 Dagbladet profile

Living people
1942 births
Writers from Kristiansand
20th-century Norwegian novelists
21st-century Norwegian novelists
Norwegian dramatists and playwrights
French–Norwegian translators
Norwegian women novelists
Postmodern writers
Norwegian women dramatists and playwrights
21st-century Norwegian women writers
20th-century Norwegian women writers
Royal Norwegian Society of Sciences and Letters